The 1996–97 Chicago Blackhawks season was the 71st season of operation of the Chicago Blackhawks in the National Hockey League.

Offseason

Regular season

Final standings

Schedule and results

Playoffs

Western Conference Quarterfinals: (1) Colorado Avalanche vs. (8) Chicago Blackhawks

Player statistics
April 24, 1997: Patrick Roy of the Colorado Avalanche shut out Chicago by a score of 7–0. He earned his 89th postseason victory and became the goalie with the most postseason wins, surpassing the old record set by New York Islanders goalie Billy Smith.

Awards and records

Transactions

Draft picks
Chicago's draft picks at the 1996 NHL Entry Draft held at the Kiel Center in St. Louis, Missouri.

See also
1996–97 NHL season

References
 

C
C
Chicago Blackhawks seasons
Chic
Chic